Defamation is the act of communicating to a third party false statements about a person, place, or thing that results in damage to its reputation. It can be spoken (slander) or written (libel). It constitutes a tort or a crime. The legal definition of defamation and related acts as well as the ways they are dealt with can vary greatly between countries and jurisdictions (what exactly they must consist of, whether they constitute crimes or not, to what extent proving the alleged facts is a valid defence).

Defamation laws can encompass a variety of acts:

 Insult against a legal person in general
 Defamation against a legal person in general
 Acts against public officials
 Acts against state institutions (e.g., government, ministries, government agencies, armed forces)
 Acts against state symbols
 Acts against the state itself
 Acts against religions (e.g., blasphemy, discrimination)
 Acts against the judiciary or legislature (e.g., contempt of court, censure)

History
Defamation law has a long history stretching back to classical antiquity. While defamation has been recognized as an actionable wrong in various forms across historical legal systems and in various moral and religious philosophies, defamation law in contemporary legal systems can primarily be traced back to Roman and early English law. 

Roman law, which forms the basis for contemporary civil and mixed law legal systems, aimed to provide society with sufficient scope for the discussion of an individual's character while protecting individuals from unnecessary insult and pain. The primary remedy for verbal defamation was long confined to a civil action for a monetary penalty calculated with regard to the significance of the defamatory statement serving both to vindicate the defamed party's reputation and to provide compensation for any damages incurred as a result of the statement, but a new remedy was introduced with the extension of the criminal law under which many kinds of defamation were punished with great severity. At the same time, increased importance attached to the publication of defamatory books and writings, the libri or libelli famosi, from which is derived the modern use of the word libel, and, under the later emperors the latter term came to be specially applied to anonymous accusations or pasquils, the dissemination of which was regarded as particularly dangerous and visited with very severe punishment whether the matters contained in them were true or false. 

The Praetorian Edict, codified circa AD 130, declared that an action could be brought up for shouting at someone contrary to good morals: "qui, adversus bonos mores convicium cui fecisse cuiusve opera factum esse dicitur, quo adversus bonos mores convicium fieret, in eum iudicium dabo." In this case, the offence was constituted by the unnecessary act of shouting. According to Ulpian, not all shouting was actionable. Drawing on the argument of Labeo, he asserted that the offence consisted in shouting contrary to the morals of the city ("adversus bonos mores huius civitatis") something apt to bring in disrepute or contempt ("quae... ad infamiam vel invidiam alicuius spectaret") the person exposed thereto. Any act apt to bring another person into disrepute gave rise to an actio injurarum. In such a case the truth of the statements was no justification for the public and insulting manner in which they had been made, but, even in public matters, the accused had the opportunity to justify his actions by openly stating what he considered necessary for public safety to be denounced by the libel and proving his assertions to be true. The second head included defamatory statements made in private, and in this case the offense lay in the content of the imputation, not in the manner of its publication. The truth was therefore a sufficient defense, for no man had a right to demand legal protection for a false reputation.

In Anglo-Saxon England, whose legal tradition is the predecessor of contemporary common law jurisdictions, slander was punished by cutting out the tongue. Historically, while defamation of a commoner in England was known as libel or slander, the defamation of a member of the English aristocracy was called scandalum magnatum, literally "the scandal of magnates".

Defamation has historically featured prominently in religious ethics and jurisprudence particularly in Abrahamic faiths. In Judaism,  lashon hara is a variety of defamation actionable under halakhic law. Lashon hara differs from other conceptions of defamation in that its focus is on the use of true speech for a wrongful purpose, rather than falsehood and harm arising. By contrast, hotzaat shem ra ("spreading a bad name"), also called hotzaat diba, consists of untrue remarks and is best translated as "slander" or "defamation". Hotzaat shem ra is worse on account of its inherent dishonesty and is consequently considered a graver sin than lashon hara. In Roman Catholic theology, defamation is seen through the lens of two distinct sins, that of lying and that of impinging on a person's right to a reputation. It is considered to be close to detraction, the sin of revealing previously unknown faults or sins of another person to a third person. While, particularly in the case of halakhic courts and dispute resolution, Jewish and Christian theological approaches to defamation are influential in shaping attitudes and public policy toward defamation, their practical influence over defamation in tort and criminal law is limited in contemporary secular legal systems.

Under Islamic law, there are various defamation-related offences and sins rooted in the historical development of Islamic jurisprudence. While contemporary Islamic or Muslim-majority jurisdictions are typically primarily common or civil law jurisdictions, Islamic jurisprudence exercises a significant influence over jurisdictions in the Islamic world seeking to "harmonise" their legal systems with Islamic worldviews. The Islamic concept of "tashir", i.e. the principle that conduct aimed at discrediting an individual's dignity or honour in the eyes of the community is inherently wrongful, informs jurists' approach to defamation in the Islamic world. Furthermore, with regard to the tension between the protection of community members' honour (which is viewed as a public good, or "God's right") and freedom of speech (which is viewed as an individual "man's right"), Islamic jurisprudence places greater emphasis on the former than on the latter.

Following the Second World War and with the rise of contemporary international human rights law, the right to a legal remedy for defamation is rooted in Article 17 of the United Nations International Covenant on Civil and Political Rights (ICCPR), which states that:

This implies a right to legal protection against defamation; however, this right co-exists with the right to freedom of opinion and expression under Article 19 of the ICCPR as well as Article 19 of the Universal Declaration of Human Rights. Article 19 of the ICCPR expressly provides that the right to freedom of opinion and expression may be limited so far as it is necessary "for respect of the rights or reputations of others". Consequently, international human rights law provides that while individual's should have the right to a legal remedy for defamation, this right must be balanced with the equally protected right to freedom of opinion and expression. In general, ensuring that domestic defamation law adequately balances individuals' right to protect their reputation with freedom of expression and of the press entails:
 Providing for truth (i.e., demonstrating that the content of the defamatory statement is true) to be a valid defence,
 Recognising reasonable publication on matters of public concern as a valid defence, and
 Ensuring that defamation may only be addressed by the legal system as a tort. 
In most of Europe, article 10 of the European Convention on Human Rights permits restrictions on freedom of speech when necessary to protect the reputation or rights of others. Additionally, restrictions of freedom of expression and other rights guaranteed by international human rights laws (including the European Convention on Human Rights (ECHR)) and by the constitutions of a variety of countries are subject to some variation of the three-part test recognised by the United Nations Human Rights Committee which requires that limitations be: 1) "provided by law that is clear and accessible to everyone", 2) "proven to be necessary and legitimate to protect the rights or reputations of others", and 3) "proportionate and the least restrictive to achieve the purported aim". This test is analogous to the Oakes Test applied domestically by the Supreme Court of Canada in assessing whether limitations on constitutional rights are "demonstrably justifiable in a free and democratic society" under Section 1 of the Canadian Charter of Rights and Freedoms, the "necessary in a democratic society" test applied by the European Court of Human Rights in assessing limitations on rights under the ECHR, Section 36 of the post-Apartheid Constitution of South Africa, and Section 24 of the 2010 Constitution of Kenya.

Aside from it being a familiar concept to those studying or knowing law, defamation, or "slander", is also known as a "smear campaign" in psychology. Those who suffer from narcissism, sociopathy, and psychopathy use it as a weapon to discredit their victims, typically when they feel you are about to expose them, or are dangerous, but oftentimes it can happen with no known motive beyond psychological projection.

Defamation as a tort

While each legal tradition approaches defamation differently, it is typically regarded as a tort for which the offended party can take civil action. The range of remedies available to successful plaintiffs in defamation cases varies between jurisdictions and range from damages to court orders requiring the defendant to retract the offending statement or to publish a correction or an apology.

Common law

Background
Modern defamation in common law jurisdictions are historically derived from English defamation law. English law allows actions for libel to be brought in the High Court for any published statements alleged to defame a named or identifiable individual or individuals (under English law companies are legal persons, and allowed to bring suit for defamation) in a manner that causes them loss in their trade or profession, or causes a reasonable person to think worse of them.

Overview
In contemporary common law jurisdictions, to constitute defamation, a claim must generally be false and must have been made to someone other than the person defamed. Some common law jurisdictions distinguish between spoken defamation, called slander, and defamation in other media such as printed words or images, called libel. The fundamental distinction between libel and slander lies solely in the form in which the defamatory matter is published. If the offending material is published in some fleeting form, such as spoken words or sounds, sign language, gestures or the like, then it is slander. In contrast, libel encompasses defamation by written or printed words, pictures, or in any form other than spoken words or gestures. The law of libel originated in the 17th century in England. With the growth of publication came the growth of libel and development of the tort of libel. The highest award in an American defamation case, at US$222.7 million was rendered in 1997 against Dow Jones in favour of MMAR Group Inc; however, the verdict was dismissed in 1999 amid allegations that MMAR failed to disclose audiotapes made by its employees.

In common law jurisdictions, civil lawsuits alleging defamation have frequently been used by both private businesses and governments to suppress and censor criticism. A notable example of such lawsuits being used to suppress political criticism of a government is the use of defamation claims by politicians in Singapore's ruling People's Action Party to harass and suppress opposition leaders such as J. B. Jeyaretnam Over the first few decades of the twenty first century, the phenomenon of strategic lawsuits against public participation has gained prominence in many common law jurisdictions outside Singapore as activists, journalists, and critics of corporations, political leaders, and public figures are increasingly targeted with vexatious defamation litigation. As a result, tort reform measures have been enacted in various jurisdictions; the California Code of Civil Procedure and Ontario's Protection of Public Participation Act do so by enabling defendants to make a special motion to strike or dismiss during which discovery is suspended and which, if successful, would terminate the lawsuit and allow the party to recover its legal costs from the plaintiff.

Defences
There are a variety of defences to defamation claims in common law jurisdictions. The two most fundamental defences arise from the doctrine in common law jurisdictions that only a false statement of fact (as opposed to opinion) can be defamatory.  This doctrine gives rise to two separate but related defences: opinion and truth. Statements of opinion cannot be regarded as defamatory as they are inherently non-falsifiable. Where a statement has been shown to be one of fact rather than opinion, the most common defence in common law jurisdictions is that of truth. Proving the truth of an allegedly defamatory statement is always a valid defence. Where a statement is partially true, certain jurisdictions in the Commonwealth have provided by statute that the defence "shall not fail by reason only that the truth of every charge is not proved if the words not proved to be true do not materially injure the claimant’s reputation having regard to the truth of the remaining charges". Similarly, the American doctrine of substantial truth provides that a statement is not defamatory if it has "slight inaccuracies of expression" but is otherwise true. Since a statement can only be defamatory if it harms another person's reputation, another defence tied to the ability of a statement to be defamatory is to demonstrate that, regardless of whether the statement is true or is a statement of fact, it does not actually harm someone's reputation.

Other defences recognised in one or more common law jurisdictions include:
 Privilege: A circumstance that justifies or excuses an act that would otherwise constitute a tort on the ground that it stemmed from a recognised interest of social importance, provides a complete bar and answer to a defamation suit, though conditions may have to be met before this protection is granted. While some privileges have long been recognised, courts may create a new privilege for particular circumstances – privilege as an affirmative defence is a potentially ever-evolving doctrine. Such newly created or circumstantially recognised privileges are referred to as residual justification privileges. There are two types of privilege in common law jurisdictions:
 Absolute privilege has the effect that a statement cannot be sued on as defamatory, even if it were made maliciously; a typical example is evidence given in court (although this may give rise to different claims, such as an action for malicious prosecution or perjury) or statements made in a session of the legislature by a member thereof (known as 'Parliamentary privilege' in Commonwealth countries).
 Qualified privilege: A more limited, or 'qualified', form of privilege may be available to journalists as a defence in circumstances where it is considered important that the facts be known in the public interest; an example would be public meetings, local government documents, and information relating to public bodies such as the police and fire departments. Another example would be that a professor – acting in good faith and honesty – may write an unsatisfactory letter of reference with unsatisfactory information.
 Mistake of fact: Statements made in a good faith and reasonable belief that they were true are generally treated the same as true statements; however, the court may inquire into the reasonableness of the belief.  The degree of care expected will vary with the nature of the defendant: an ordinary person might safely rely on a single newspaper report, while the newspaper would be expected to carefully check multiple sources.
 Mere vulgar abuse: An insult that is not necessarily defamatory if it is not intended to be taken literally or believed, or likely to cause real damage to a reputation. Vituperative statements made in anger, such as calling someone "an arse" during a drunken argument, would likely be considered mere vulgar abuse and not defamatory.
 Fair comment: Statements made with an honest belief in their soundness on a matter of public interest (such as regarding official acts) are defendable against a defamation claim, even if such arguments are logically unsound; if a reasonable person could honestly entertain such an opinion, the statement is protected.
 Consent: In rare cases, a defendant can argue that the plaintiff consented to the dissemination of the statement.
 Innocent dissemination: A defendant is not liable if they had no actual knowledge of the defamatory statement or no reason to believe the statement was defamatory.  Thus, a delivery service cannot be held liable for delivering a sealed defamatory letter.  The defence can be defeated if the lack of knowledge was due to negligence.
 Incapability of further defamation: Historically, it was a defence at common law that the claimant's position in the community is so poor that defamation could not do further damage to the plaintiff. Such a claimant could be said to be "libel-proof", since in most jurisdictions, actual damage is an essential element for a libel claim.  Essentially, the defence was that the person had such a bad reputation before the libel, that no further damage could possibly have been caused by the making of the statement.
 Statute of limitations: Most jurisdictions require that a lawsuit be brought within a limited period of time. If the alleged libel occurs in a mass media publication such as a newspaper or the Internet, the statute of limitations begins to run at the time of publication, not when the plaintiff first learns of the communication.
 No third-party communication: If an employer were to bring an employee into a sound-proof, isolated room, and accuse him of embezzling company money, the employee would have no defamation recourse, since no one other than the would-be plaintiff and would-be defendant heard the false statement.
 No actual injury: If there is third-party communication, but the third-party hearing the defamatory statement does not believe the statement, or does not care, then there is no injury, and therefore, no recourse.

 Triviality: The trivial nature of a statement can be a defence in certain common law jurisdictions whereby a statement is not defamatory if it is so trivial in nature as to be incapable of materially injuring the plaintiff's reputation.

Defamation per se
Many common law jurisdictions recognise that some categories of statements are considered to be defamatory per se, such that people making a defamation claim for these statements do not need to prove that the statement was defamatory. In an action for defamation per se, the law recognises that certain false statements are so damaging that they create a presumption of injury to the plaintiff's reputation, allowing a defamation case to proceed to verdict with no actual proof of damages. Although laws vary by state, and not all jurisdictions recognise defamation per se, there are four general categories of false statement that typically support a per se action:
 accusing someone of a crime;
 alleging that someone has a foul or loathsome disease;
 adversely reflecting on a person's fitness to conduct their business or trade; and
 imputing serious sexual misconduct.
If the plaintiff proves that such a statement was made and was false, to recover damages the plaintiff need only prove that someone had made the statement to any third party. No proof of special damages is required. However, to recover full compensation a plaintiff should be prepared to prove actual damages.
As with any defamation case, truth remains an absolute defence to defamation per se. This means that even if the statement would be considered defamatory per se if false, if the defendant establishes that it is in fact true, an action for defamation per se cannot survive. The conception of what type of allegation may support an action for defamation per se can evolve with public policy. For example, in May 2012 an appeals court in New York, citing changes in public policy with regard to homosexuality, ruled that describing someone as gay is not defamation.

Variations within common law jurisdictions
While defamation torts are broadly similar across common law jurisdictions; differences have arisen as a result of diverging case law, statutes and other legislative action, and constitutional concerns specific to individual jurisdictions.

Some jurisdictions have a separate tort or delict of injury, intentional infliction of emotional distress, involving the making of a statement, even if truthful, intended to harm the claimant out of malice; some have a separate tort or delict of "invasion of privacy" in which the making of a true statement may give rise to liability: but neither of these comes under the general heading of "defamation". The tort of harassment created by Singapore's Protection from Harassment Act 2014 is an example of a tort of this type being created by statute. There is also, in almost all jurisdictions, a tort or delict of "misrepresentation", involving the making of a statement that is untrue even though not defamatory. Thus a surveyor who states a house is free from risk of flooding has not defamed anyone, but may still be liable to someone who purchases the house relying on this statement.  Other increasingly common claims similar to defamation in U.S. law are claims that a famous trademark has been diluted through tarnishment, see generally trademark dilution, "intentional interference with contract", and "negligent misrepresentation". In America, for example, the unique tort of false light protects plaintiffs against statements which are not technically false but are misleading. Libel and slander both require publication.

Although laws vary by state; in America, a defamation action typically requires that a plaintiff claiming defamation prove that the defendant:
 made a false and defamatory statement concerning the plaintiff;
 shared the statement with a third party (that is, somebody other than the person defamed by the statement);
 if the defamatory matter is of public concern, acted in a manner which amounted at least to negligence on the part of the defendant; and
 caused damages to the plaintiff.
Additionally, American courts apply special rules in the case of statements made in the press concerning public figures, which can be used as a defence. While plaintiff alleging defamation in an American court must usually prove that the statement caused harm, and was made without adequate research into the truthfulness of the statement; where the plaintiff is a celebrity or public official, they must additionally prove that the statement was made with actual malice (i.e. the intent to do harm or with reckless disregard for the truth).  A series of court rulings led by New York Times Co. v. Sullivan, 376 U.S. 254 (1964) established that for a public official (or other legitimate public figure) to win a libel case in an American court, the statement must have been published knowing it to be false or with reckless disregard to its truth (i.e. actual malice). The Associated Press estimates that 95% of libel cases involving news stories do not arise from high-profile news stories, but "run of the mill" local stories like news coverage of local criminal investigations or trials, or business profiles. Media liability insurance is available to newspapers to cover potential damage awards from libel lawsuits. An early example of libel is the case of John Peter Zenger in 1735. Zenger was hired to publish the New York Weekly Journal. When he printed another man's article criticising William Cosby, the royal governor of Colonial New York, Zenger was accused of seditious libel. The verdict was returned as not guilty on the charge of seditious libel, because it was proven that all the statements Zenger had published about Cosby had been true, so there was not an issue of defamation. Another example of libel is the case of New York Times Co. v. Sullivan (1964). The American Supreme Court overruled a state court in Alabama that had found The New York Times guilty of libel for printing an advertisement that criticised Alabama officials for mistreating student civil rights activists. Even though some of what The Times printed was false, the court ruled in its favour, saying that libel of a public official requires proof of actual malice, which was defined as a "knowing or reckless disregard for the truth".

Many jurisdictions within the Commonwealth (e.g. Singapore, Ontario, and the United Kingdom) have enacted legislation to:
 Codify the defences of fair comment and qualified privilege
 Provide that, while most instances of slander continue to require special damage to be proved (i.e. prove that pecuniary loss was caused by the defamatory statement), instances such as slander of title shall not
 Clarify that broadcast statements (including those that are only broadcast in spoken form) constitute libel rather than slander.
Libel law in England and Wales was overhauled even further by the Defamation Act 2013.

Defamation in Indian tort law largely resembles that of England and Wales. Indian courts have endorsed the defences of absolute and qualified privilege, fair comment, and justification. While statutory law in the United Kingdom provides that, if the defendant is only successful in proving the truth of some of the several charges against him, the defence of justification might still be available if the charges not proved do not materially injure the reputation, there is no corresponding provision in India, though it is likely that Indian courts would treat this principle as persuasive precedent. Recently, incidents of defamation in relation to public figures have attracted public attention.

The origins of U.S. defamation law pre-date the American Revolution. Though the First Amendment of the American Constitution was designed to protect freedom of the press, it was primarily envisioned to prevent censorship by the state rather than defamation suits; thus, for most of American history, the Supreme Court did not interpret the First Amendment as applying to libel cases involving media defendants. This left libel laws, based upon the traditional common law of defamation inherited from the English legal system, mixed across the states. The 1964 case New York Times Co. v. Sullivan dramatically altered the nature of libel law in the country by elevating the fault element for public officials to actual malicethat is, public figures could win a libel suit only if they could demonstrate the publisher's "knowledge that the information was false" or that the information was published "with reckless disregard of whether it was false or not". Later the Supreme Court held that statements that are so ridiculous to be clearly not true are protected from libel claims, as are statements of opinion relating to matters of public concern that do not contain a provably false factual connotation. Subsequent state and federal cases have addressed defamation law and the Internet.

American defamation law is much less plaintiff-friendly than its counterparts in European and the Commonwealth countries. A comprehensive discussion of what is and is not libel or slander under American law is difficult, as the definition differs between different states and is further affected by federal law. Some states codify what constitutes slander and libel together, merging the concepts into a single defamation law.

Australian law of defamation developed  out of the English law of defamation and its cases; however, as in America, there are differences introduced by statute and by the implied constitutional limitation on governmental powers to limit speech of a political nature established in Lange v Australian Broadcasting Corporation (1997). In 2006, uniform defamation laws came into effect across Australia. In addition to fixing the problematic inconsistencies in law between individual States and Territories, the laws made a number of reforms, including:
 Abolishing the distinction between libel and slander.
 Providing new defences including that of triviality, where it is a defence to the publication of a defamatory matter if the defendant proves that the circumstances of publication were such that the plaintiff was unlikely to sustain any harm.
 Providing that defences against defamation may be negated if there is proof the publication was actuated by malice.
 Greatly restricting the right of corporations to sue for defamation (see e.g. Defamation Act 2005 (Vic), s 9). Corporations may, however, still sue for the tort of injurious falsehood, where the burden of proof is greater than in defamation, because the plaintiff must show that the defamation was made with malice and resulted in economic loss.
The 2006 reforms also established across all Australian states the availability of truth as an unqualified defence; previously a number of states only allowed a defence of truth with the condition that a public interest or benefit existed. The defendant however still needs to prove that the defamatory imputations are substantially true. The law as it currently stands in Australia was summarised in the 2015 case of Duffy v Google by Justice Blue in the Supreme Court of South Australia.

Similarly, New Zealand received English law with the signing of the Treaty of Waitangi in February 1840. The current Act is the Defamation Act 1992 which came into force on 1 February 1993 and repealed the Defamation Act 1954. New Zealand law allows for the following remedies in an action for defamation: compensatory damages; an injunction to stop further publication; a correction or a retraction; and in certain cases, punitive damages. Section 28 of the Act allows for punitive damages only when a there is a flagrant disregard of the rights of the person defamed. As the law assumes that an individual suffers loss if a statement is defamatory, there is no need to prove that specific damage or loss has occurred.  However, Section 6 of the Act allows for a defamation action brought by a corporate body to proceed only when the body corporate alleges and proves that the publication of the defamation has caused or is likely to cause pecuniary loss to that body corporate.

As is the case for most Commonwealth jurisdictions, Canada follows English law on defamation issues (except in Quebec where the private law is derived from French civil law). In common law provinces and territories, defamation covers any communication that tends to lower the esteem of the subject in the minds of ordinary members of the public. Probably true statements are not excluded, nor are political opinions.  Intent is always presumed, and it is not necessary to prove that the defendant intended to defame.  In Hill v. Church of Scientology of Toronto (1995), the Supreme Court of Canada rejected the actual malice test adopted in the US case New York Times Co. v. Sullivan. Once a claim has been made, the defendant may avail themselves of a defence of justification (the truth), fair comment, responsible communication, or privilege. Publishers of defamatory comments may also use the defence of innocent dissemination where they had no knowledge of the nature of the statement, it was not brought to their attention, and they were not negligent.

Roman Dutch and Scots law
Defamation in jurisdictions applying Roman Dutch law (i.e. most of Southern Africa, Indonesia, Suriname, and the Dutch Caribbean) gives rise to a claim by way of "actio iniuriarum". For liability under the actio iniuriarum, the general elements of delict must be present, but specific rules have been developed for each element. Causation, for example, is seldom in issue, and is assumed to be present. The elements of liability under the actio iniuriarum are as follows: 
 harm, in the form of a violation of a personality interest (one's corpus, dignitas and fama);
 wrongful conduct; and
 intention.

Under the actio iniuriarum, harm consists in the infringement of a personality right, either "corpus", "dignitas", or "fama". Dignitas is a generic term meaning ‘worthiness, dignity, self-respect’, and comprises related concerns like mental tranquillity and privacy. Because it is such a wide concept, its infringement must be serious. Not every insult is humiliating; one must prove contumelia. This includes insult (iniuria in the narrow sense), adultery, loss of consortium, alienation of affection, breach of promise (but only in a humiliating or degrading manner), et cetera. "Fama" is a generic term referring to reputation and actio iniuriarum pertaining to it encompasses defamation more broadly Beyond simply covering actions that fall within the broader concept of defamation, "actio iniuriarum" relating to infringements of a person's corpus provides civil remedies for assaults, acts of a sexual or indecent nature, and ‘wrongful arrest and detention’.

In Scots law, which is closely related to Roman Dutch law, the remedy for defamation is similarly the actio iniuriarium and the most common defence is "veritas" (i.e. proving the truth of otherwise defamatory statement). Defamation falls within the realm of non-patrimonial (i.e. dignitary) interests. The Scots law pertaining to the protection of non-patrimonial interests is said to be 'a thing of shreds and patches'. This notwithstanding, there is ‘little historical basis in Scots law for the kind of structural difficulties that have restricted English law' in the development of mechanisms to protect so-called 'rights of personality'. The actio iniuriarum heritage of Scots law gives the courts scope to recognise, and afford reparation in, cases in which no patrimonial (or 'quasi-patrimonial') 'loss' has occurred, but a recognised dignitary interest has nonetheless been invaded through the wrongful conduct of the defender. For such reparation to be offered, however, the non-patrimonial interest must be deliberately affronted: negligent interference with a non-patrimonial interest will not be sufficient to generate liability. An actio iniuriarum requires that the conduct of the defender be 'contumelious' - that is, it must show such hubristic disregard of the pursuer's recognised personality interest that an intention to affront (animus iniuriandi) might be imputed.

Other legal systems

Taiwan
There are four distinct systems of tort, and therefore civil defamation, law presently in force in Taiwan, three of which are in force in different regions administered by the People's Republic of China and one of which is in force in the Republic of China. Areas administered by the Republic of China include:
 Taiwan
 Penghu
 Kinmen
 Matsu Islands ( is a common law jurisdiction whose defamation law is largely identical to that of England and Wales, Macau operates under a distinct framework modelled after Portuguese civil law, and most aspects of civil law in the Mainland are governed by the 2021 Civil Code of the People's Republic of China. In contrast, all areas of the Republic of China are governed by the Civil Code of the Republic of China which was originally modelled after the Japanese Six Codes system, itself primarily based on the German pandectist approach to law.

China
While tort law in China is generally governed by Book Seven ("Tort Liability") of the Civil Code of the People's Republic of China (CCPRC), liability for defamation is provided for in Book Four ("Personality Rights"). Article 1024 provides that "no organisation or individual may infringe upon other’s right to reputation by insultation, defamation, or the like", defining "reputation" as "a social evaluation of the moral character, prestige, talent, and credit of a person". In addition to damages, remedies for defamation may include the right to request a "correction" or the timely deletion of defamatory content.

Qualified privilege for journalists and individuals acting "for public interest purposes" and such individuals "shall not bear civil liability for defamation except where one of the following situations exists:
　　(1) he has fabricated or distorted the facts;
　　(2) he has failed to fulfill the obligation to reasonably verify the seriously misrepresentative information provided by others; or
　　(3) he has used insulting words and the like to degrade the other’s reputation".

Article 1027 provides that, while "literary or artistic work" depicts actual people "with insulting or defamatory content" that "infringes upon another persons’ right to reputation" is considered defamation under the CCPRC, works which do "not depict a specific person" but "some patterns of the story are similar to the situation of such person" shall not constitute defamation.

Republic of China
Liability for defamation under the Civil Code of the Republic of China stems from article 195 which provides for tort liability in the case of certain non-pecuniary injuries, particularly "reputation", "privacy", and "personality".

France
While defamation law in most jurisdictions centres on the protection of individuals' dignity or reputation, defamation law in France is particularly rooted in protecting the privacy of individuals. While the broader scope of the rights protected make defamation cases easier to prove in France than, for example, in England; awards in defamation cases are significantly lower and it is common for courts to award symbolic damages as low as €1. Controversially, damages in defamation cases brought by public officials are higher than those brought by ordinary citizens, which has a chilling effect on criticism of public policy While the only statutory defence available under French defamation law is to demonstrate the truth of the defamatory statement in question, a defence that is unavailable in cases involving an individual's personal life; French courts have recognised three additional exceptions:
References to matters over ten years old
References to a person's pardoned or expunged criminal record
A plea of good faith, which may be made if the statement 
pursues a legitimate aim
is not driven by animosity or malice
is prudent and measured in presentation
is backed by a serious investigation that dutifully sought to ascertain the truth of the statement.

Japan
Under article 723 of the Japanese Civil Code, a court is empowered to order a tortfeasor in a defamation case to "take suitable measures for the restoration of the [plaintiff's] reputation either in lieu of or together with compensation for damages". An example of a civil defamation case in Japan can be found at Japan civil court finds against ZNTIR President Yositoki (Mitsuo) Hataya and Yoshiaki.

Philippines
In some systems, notably the Philippines, truth alone is not a defence. It is also necessary in these cases to show that there is a well-founded public interest in the specific information being widely known, and this may be the case even for public figures.  Public interest is generally not "what the public is interested in", but rather "what is in the interest of the public". In a 2012 ruling involving Philippine libel law, the United Nations Commission on Human Rights commented, "Penal defamation laws should include defence of truth."

Thailand
The Civil and Commercial Code of Thailand provides that:

In practice, defamation law in Thailand has been found by the Office of the United Nations High Commissioner for Human Rights to be facilitate hostile and vexatious litigation by business interests seeking to suppress criticism.

Quebec
In Quebec, defamation was originally grounded in the law inherited from France and is presently established by Chapter III, Title 2 of Book One of the Civil Code of Quebec, which provides that "every person has a right to the respect of his reputation and privacy".

To establish civil liability for defamation, the plaintiff must establish, on a balance of probabilities, the existence of an injury (fault), a wrongful act (damage), and of a causal connection (link of causality) between the two.  A person who has made defamatory remarks will not necessarily be civilly liable for them.  The plaintiff must further demonstrate that the person who made the remarks committed a wrongful act. Defamation in Quebec is governed by a reasonableness standard, as opposed to strict liability; a defendant who made a false statement would not be held liable if it was reasonable to believe the statement was true.

Defamation as a crime

In addition to tort law, many jurisdictions treat defamation as a criminal offence and provide for penalties as such. Article 19, a British free expression advocacy group, has published global maps charting the existence of criminal defamation law across the globe, as well as showing countries that have special protections for political leaders or functionaries of the state.

There can be regional statutes that may differ from the national norm. For example, in the United States, criminal defamation is generally limited to the living. However, there are 7 states (Idaho, Kansas, Louisiana, Nevada, North Dakota, Oklahoma, Utah) that have criminal statutes regarding defamation of the dead.

The Organization for Security and Co-operation in Europe (OSCE) has also published a detailed database on criminal and civil defamation provisions in 55 countries, including all European countries, all member countries of the Commonwealth of Independent States, America, and Canada.

In a 2012 ruling on a complaint filed by a broadcaster who had been imprisoned for violating Philippine libel law, the United Nations Commission on Human Rights held that the criminalisation of libel without provision of a public figure doctrine – as in Philippine criminal law – violates freedom of expression and is inconsistent with Article 19 of the International Covenant on Civil and Political Rights.

Questions of group libel have been appearing in common law for hundreds of years. One of the earliest known cases of a defendant being tried for defamation of a group was the case of R v Orme and Nutt (1700). In this case, the jury found that the defendant was guilty of libeling several subjects, though they did not specifically identify who these subjects were. A report of the case told that the jury believed that "where a writing ... inveighs against mankind in general, or against a particular order of men, as for instance, men of the gown, this is no libel, but it must descend to particulars and individuals to make it libel." This jury believed that only individuals who believed they were specifically defamed had a claim to a libel case. Since the jury was unable to identify the exact people who were being defamed, there was no cause to identify the statements were a libel.

Another early English group libel which has been frequently cited is King v. Osborne (1732). In this case, the defendant was on trial "for printing a libel reflecting upon the Portuguese Jews". The printing in question claimed that Jews who had arrived in London from Portugal burned a Jewish woman to death when she had a child with a Christian man, and that this act was common. Following Osborne's anti-Semitic publication, several Jews were attacked. Initially, the judge seemed to believe the court could do nothing since no individual was singled out by Osborne's writings. However, the court concluded that "since the publication implied the act was one Jews frequently did, the whole community of Jews was defamed." Though various reports of this case give differing accounts of the crime, this report clearly shows a ruling based on group libel. Since laws restricting libel were accepted at this time because of its tendency to lead to a breach of peace, group libel laws were justified because they showed potential for an equal or perhaps greater risk of violence. For this reason, group libel cases are criminal even though most libel cases are civil torts.

As of 2017, at least 130 UNESCO member states retained criminal defamation laws. In 2017, the Organization for Security and Co-operation in Europe (OSCE) Office of the Representative on Freedom of the Media issued a report on criminal defamation and anti-blasphemy laws among its member states, which found that defamation is criminalised in nearly three-quarters (42) of the 57 OSCE participating states. Many of the laws pertaining to defamation include specific provisions for harsher punishment for speech or publications critical of heads of state, public officials, state bodies and the state itself. The OSCE report also noted that blasphemy and religious insult laws exist in around one third of OSCE participating states; many of these combine blasphemy and religious insult with elements of hate speech legislation.

In Africa, at least four member states decriminalised defamation between 2012 and 2017. The ruling by the African Court on Human and Peoples' Rights in Lohé Issa Konaté v. The Republic of Burkina Faso set a precedent in the region against imprisonment as a legitimate penalty for defamation, framing it as a violation of the African Charter on Human and Peoples' Rights (ACHPR), the International Covenant on Civil and Political Rights (ICCPR) and the treaty of the Economic Community of West African States (ECOWAS).

Countries in every region have moved to further extend criminal defamation law to online content. Cybercrime and anti-terrorism laws passed throughout the world have led to bloggers appearing before courts, with some serving time in prison.

In a variety of Common Law jurisdictions, criminal laws prohibiting protests at funerals, sedition, false statements in connection with elections, and the use of profanity in public, are also often used in contexts similar to criminal libel actions. The boundaries of a court's power to hold individuals in "contempt of court" for what amounts to alleged defamatory statements about judges or the court process by attorneys or other people involved in court cases is also not well established in many common law countries.

Criticism

While defamation torts are less controversial as they ostensibly involve plaintiffs seeking to protect their right to dignity and their reputation, criminal defamation is more controversial as it involves the state expressly seeking to restrict freedom of expression. Human rights organisations, and other organisations such as the Council of Europe and Organization for Security and Co-operation in Europe, have campaigned against strict defamation laws that criminalise defamation. The freedom of expression advocacy group Article 19 opposes criminal defamation, arguing that civil defamation laws providing defences for statements on matters of public interest are better compliant with international human rights law. The European Court of Human Rights has placed restrictions on criminal libel laws because of the freedom of expression provisions of the European Convention on Human Rights. One notable case was Lingens v. Austria (1986).

The United Nations, OSCE, Organization of American States (OAS) and African Union Commission on Human and Peoples' Rights Special Rapporteurs for Freedom of Expression stated in a joint declaration in March 2017 that "general prohibitions on the dissemination of information based on vague and ambiguous ideas, including 'false news' or 'non-objective information', are incompatible with international standards for restrictions on freedom of expression ... and should be abolished."

By jurisdiction

Note: This table lacks detail, to avoid potential copyright issues with the OSCE. Readers are advised to check the OSCE document instead.

Albania
According to the Criminal Code of Albania, defamation is a crime. Slandering in the knowledge of falsity is subject to fines of from  ALL (c. $350) to one million ALL (c. $). If the slandering occurs in public or damages multiple people, the fine is 40,000 ALL to three million ALL (c. $). In addition, defamation of authorities, public officials or foreign representatives (Articles 227, 239 to 241) are separate crimes with maximum penalties varying from one to three years of imprisonment.

Argentina
In Argentina, the crimes of calumny and injury are foreseen in the chapter "Crimes Against Honor" (Articles 109 to 117-bis) of the Penal Code. Calumny is defined as "the false imputation to a determined person of a concrete crime that leads to a lawsuit" (Article 109). However, expressions referring to subjects of public interest or that are not assertive do not constitute calumny. Penalty is a fine from 3,000 to 30,000 pesos. He who intentionally dishonor or discredit a determined person is punished with a penalty from 1,500 to 20,000 pesos (Article 110).

He who publishes or reproduces, by any means, calumnies and injuries made by others, will be punished as responsible himself for the calumnies and injuries whenever its content is not correctly attributed to the corresponding source. Exceptions are expressions referring to subjects of public interest or that are not assertive (see Article 113). When calumny or injury are committed through the press, a possible extra penalty is the publication of the judicial decision at the expenses of the guilty (Article 114). He who passes to someone else information about a person that is included in a personal database and that one knows to be false, is punished with six months to 3 years in prison. When there is harm to somebody, penalties are aggravated by an extra half (Article 117 bis, §§ 2nd and 3rd).

Austria
In Austria, the crime of defamation is foreseen by Article 111 of the Criminal Code. Related criminal offences include "slander and assault" (Article 115), that happens "if a person insults, mocks, mistreats or threatens will ill-treatment another one in public", and yet "malicious falsehood" (Article 297), defined as a false accusation that exposes someone to the risk of prosecution.

Azerbaijan
In Azerbaijan, the crime of defamation (Article 147) may result in a fine up to "500 times the amount of minimum salaries", public work for up to 240 hours, correctional work for up to one year, or imprisonment of up to six months. Penalties are aggravated to up to three years of prison if the victim is falsely accused of having committed a crime "of grave or very grave nature" (Article 147.2). The crime of insult (Article 148) can lead to a fine of up to 1,000 times the minimum wage, or to the same penalties of defamation for public work, correctional work or imprisonment.

According to the OSCE report on defamation laws, "Azerbaijan intends to remove articles on defamation and insult from criminal legislation and preserve them in the Civil Code".

Belgium
In Belgium, crimes against honor are foreseen in Chapter V of the Belgian Penal Code, Articles 443 to 453-bis. Someone is guilty of calumny "when law admits proof of the alleged fact" and of defamation "when law does not admit this evidence" (Article 443). The penalty is eight days to one year of imprisonment, plus a fine (Article 444). In addition, the crime of "calumnious denunciation" (Article 445) is punished with 15 days to six months in prison, plus a fine. In any of the crimes covered by Chapter V of the Penal Code, the minimum penalty may be doubled (Article 453-bis) "when one of the motivations of the crime is hatred, contempt or hostility of a person due to his or her intended race, colour of the skin, ancestry, national origin or ethnicity, nationality, gender, sexual orientation, marital status, place of birth, age, patrimony, philosophical or religious belief, present or future health condition, disability, native language, political belief, physical or genetical characteristic, or social origin".

Brazil
In Brazil, defamation is a crime, which is prosecuted either as "defamation" (three months to a year in prison, plus fine; Article 139 of the Penal Code), "calumny" (six months to two years in prison, plus fine; Article 138 of the PC) or "injury" (one to six months in prison, or fine; Article 140), with aggravating penalties when the crime is practiced in public (Article 141, item III) or against a state employee because of his regular duties. Incitation to hatred and violence is also foreseen in the Penal Code (incitation to a crime, Article 286). Moreover, in situations like bullying or moral constraint, defamation acts are also covered by the crimes of "illegal constraint" (Article 146 of the Penal Code) and "arbitrary exercise of discretion" (Article 345 of PC), defined as breaking the law as a vigilante.

Bulgaria
In Bulgaria, defamation is formally a criminal offence, but the penalty of imprisonment was abolished in 1999. Articles 146 (insult), 147 (criminal defamation) and 148 (public insult) of the Criminal Code prescribe a penalty of fine.

Canada
In Canada, the Criminal Code specifies the following as criminal offences:
 Defamatory libel, defined as "matter published, without lawful justification or excuse, that is likely to injure the reputation of any person by exposing him to hatred, contempt or ridicule, or that is designed to insult the person of or concerning whom it is published", receives the same penalty.
 A "libel known to be false" is an indictable offence, for which the prison term is a maximum of five years.

The criminal portion of the law has been rarely applied, but it has been observed that, when treated as an indictable offence, it often appears to arise from statements made against an agent of the Crown, such as a police officer, a corrections officer, or a Crown attorney. In the most recent case, in 2012, an Ottawa restaurant owner was convicted of ongoing online harassment of a customer who had complained about the quality of food and service in her restaurant.

According to an Organization for Security and Co-operation in Europe official report on defamation laws issued in 2005, 57 persons in Canada were accused of defamation, libel and insult, among which 23 were convicted – 9 to prison sentences, 19 to probation and one to a fine. The average period in prison was 270 days, and the maximum sentence was 4 years of imprisonment.

Croatia
In Croatia, the crime of insult prescribes a penalty of up to three months in prison, or a fine of "up to 100 daily incomes" (Criminal Code, Article 199). If the crime is committed in public, penalties are aggravated to up to six months of imprisonment, or a fine of "up to 150 daily incomes" (Article 199–2). Moreover, the crime of defamation occurs when someone affirms or disseminates false facts about other person that can damage his reputation. The maximum penalty is one year in prison, or a fine of up to 150 daily incomes (Article 200–1). If the crime is committed in public, the prison term can reach one year (Article 200–2). On the other hand, according to Article 203, there is an exemption for the application of the aforementioned articles (insult and defamation) when the specific context is that of a scientific work, literary work, work of art, public information conducted by a politician or a government official, journalistic work, or the defence of a right or the protection of justifiable interests, in all cases provided that the conduct was not aimed at damaging someone's reputation.

Chile
In Chile, the crimes of calumny and slanderous allegation are covered by Articles 412 to 431 of the Penal Code. Calumny is defined as "the false imputation of a determined crime and that can lead to a public prosecution" (Article 412). If the calumny is written and with publicity, penalty is "lower imprisonment" in its medium degree plus a fine of 11 to 20 "vital wages" when it refers to a crime, or "lower imprisonment" in its minimum degree plus a fine of six to ten "vital wages" when it refers to a misdemeanor (Article 413). If it is not written or with publicity, penalty is "lower imprisonment" in its minimum degree plus a fine of six to fifteen "vital wages" when it is about a crime, or plus a fine of six to ten "vital wages" when it is about a misdemeanor (Article 414).

According to Article 25 of the Penal Code, "lower imprisonment" is defined as a prison term between 61 days and five years. According to Article 30, the penalty of "lower imprisonment" in its medium or minimum degrees carries with it also the suspension of the exercise of a public position during the prison term.

Article 416 defines  as "all expression said or action performed that dishonors, discredits or causes contempt". Article 417 defines broadly  (grave slander), including the imputation of a crime or misdemeanor that cannot lead to public prosecution, and the imputation of a vice or lack of morality, which are capable of harming considerably the reputation, credit or interests of the offended person. "Grave slander" in written form or with publicity are punished with "lower imprisonment" in its minimum to medium degrees plus a fine of eleven to twenty "vital wages". Calumny or slander of a deceased person (Article 424) can be prosecuted by the spouse, children, grandchildren, parents, grandparents, siblings and heirs of the offended person. Finally, according to Article 425, in the case of calumnies and slander published in foreign newspapers, are considered liable all those who from Chilean territory sent articles or gave orders for publication abroad, or contributed to the introduction of such newspapers in Chile with the intention of propagating the calumny and slander.

China
In the Chinese mainland, Article 246 of the Criminal Law of the People's Republic of China makes serious defamation punishable by fixed-term imprisonment of not more than three years or criminal detention upon complaint, unless it is against the government.

In areas administered by the Republic of China, Article 310 of the Criminal Code criminalises defamation, held constitutional on 7 July 2000 by the Justices of the Constitutional Court, Judicial Yuan. The court's reasoning in upholding the law was that, while Article 11 of the Constitution of the Republic of China protects freedom of speech, the right is "subject to suitable restraints" where this is necessary to "protect other fundamental rights, such as personal reputation and privacy". While Article 310 provides that an individual accused of criminal defamation is to be acquitted if they are able to prove the truth of the defamatory statement in question; the court interpreted this to mean that, even if the accused fails to demonstrate that the statement was true, they may not be convicted if they had reasonable grounds to believe that the statement was true when it was made and that the burden of proof still lies with the prosecution. The continued criminalisation of defamation in the Republic of China is controversial, with an editorial in the Taipei Times published in January 2022 arguing that prosecutors, being "a common asset of society", ought to "put all their efforts into major crimes rather than private disputes" and that criminal defamation "inappropriately" transforms the nations' courts into courts of "folk morality".

Czech Republic
According to the Czech Criminal Code, Article 184, defamation is a crime. Penalties may reach a maximum prison term of one year (Article 184–1) or, if the crime is committed through the press, film, radio, TV, publicly accessible computer network, or by "similarly effective" methods, the offender may stay in prison for up to two years or be prohibited of exercising a specific activity.
However, only the most severe cases will be subject to criminal prosecution. The less severe cases can be solved by an action for apology, damages or injunctions.

Denmark
In Denmark, libel is a crime, as defined by Article 267 of the Danish Criminal Code, with a penalty of up to six months in prison or a fine, with proceedings initiated by the victim. In addition, Article 266-b prescribes a maximum prison term of two years in the case of public defamation aimed at a group of persons because of their race, colour, national or ethnic origin, religion or "sexual inclination".

Finland
In Finland, defamation is a crime, according to the Criminal Code (Chapter 24, Sections 9 and 10), punishable with a fine, or, if aggravated, with up to two years' imprisonment or a fine. Defamation is defined as spreading a false report or insinuation apt to cause harm to a person, or otherwise disparaging someone. Defamation of the deceased may also constitute an offence if apt to cause harm to surviving loved ones. In addition, there is a crime called "dissemination of information violating personal privacy" (Chapter 24, Section 8), which consists in disseminating information, even accurate, in a way that is apt to harm someone's right to privacy. Information that may be relevant with regard to a person's conduct in public office, in business, or in a comparable position, or of information otherwise relevant to a matter of public interest, is not covered by this prohibition. Finnish criminal law has no provisions penalizing the defamation of corporate entities, only of natural persons.

France

In France, defamation is a criminal offence defined as "the allegation or [the] allocation of a fact that damages the honor or reputation of the person or body to which the fact is imputed". A defamatory allegation is considered an insult if it does not include any facts or if the claimed facts cannot be verified.

Germany
In German law, there is no distinction between libel and slander. , German defamation lawsuits are increasing. The relevant offences of Germany's Criminal Code are §90 (denigration of the Federal President), §90a (denigration of the [federal] State and its symbols), §90b (unconstitutional denigration of the organs of the Constitution), §185 ("insult"), §186 (defamation of character), §187 (defamation with deliberate untruths), §188 (political defamation with increased penalties for offending against paras 186 and 187), §189 (denigration of a deceased person), §192 ("insult" with true statements). Other sections relevant to prosecution of these offences are §190 (criminal conviction as proof of truth), §193 (no defamation in the pursuit of rightful interests), §194 (application for a criminal prosecution under these paragraphs), §199 (mutual insult allowed to be left unpunished), and §200 (method of proclamation).

Greece
In Greece, the maximum prison term for defamation, libel or insult was five years, while the maximum fine was €15,000.

The crime of insult (Article 361, § 1, of the Penal Code) may have led to up to one year of imprisonment or a fine, while unprovoked insult (Article
361-A, § 1) was punished with at least three months in prison. In addition, defamation may have resulted in up to two months in prison or a fine, while aggravated defamation could have led to at least three months of prison, plus a possible fine (Article 363) and deprivation of the offender's civil rights. Finally, disparaging the memory of a deceased person is punished with imprisonment of up to six months (Penal Code, Article 365).

India
In India, a defamation case can be filed under either criminal law or civil law or cyber crime law, together or in sequence.

According to the Constitution of India, the fundamental right to free speech (Article 19) is subject to "reasonable restrictions":

Accordingly, for the purpose of criminal defamation, "reasonable restrictions" are defined in Section 499 of the Indian Penal Code, 1860. This section defines defamation and provides ten valid exceptions when a statement is not considered to be defamation. It says that defamation takes place, when someone "by words either spoken or intended to be read, or by signs or by visible representations, makes or publishes any imputation concerning any person intending to harm, or knowing or having reason to believe that such imputation will harm, the reputation of such person". The punishment is simple imprisonment for up to two years, or a fine, or both (Section 500).

Some other offences related to false allegations: false statements regarding elections (Section 171G), false information (Section 182), false claims in court (Section 209), false criminal charges (Section 211).

Some other offences related to insults: against public servants in judicial proceedings (Section 228), against  religion or religious beliefs (Section 295A), against religious feelings (Section 298), against breach of peace (Section 504), against modesty of women (Section 509).

According to the Indian Code of Criminal Procedure, 1973 defamation is prosecuted only upon a complaint (within six months from the act) (Section 199), and is a bailable, non-cognisable and compoundable offence (See: The First Schedule, Classification of Offences).

Ireland
According to the (revised) Defamation Act 2009, the last criminal offences (Sections 36–37, blasphemy) seem to have been repealed. The statute of limitations is one year from the time of first publication (may be extended to two years by the courts) (Section 38). See also: Blasphemy law in the Republic of Ireland, Censorship in the Republic of Ireland, Statute of Limitations in Ireland.

The 2009 Act repeals the Defamation Act 1961, which had, together with the underlying principles of the common law of tort, governed Irish defamation law for almost half a century. The 2009 Act represents significant changes in Irish law, as many believe that it previously attached insufficient importance to the media's freedom of expression and weighed too heavily in support of the individual's right to a good name.

Israel
According to Defamation Prohibition Law (1965), defamation can constitute either civil or criminal offence.

As a criminal offence, defamation is punishable by a year of imprisonment. In order to constitute a felony, defamation must be intentional and target at least two persons.

Italy
In Italy, there used to be different crimes against honor. The crime of injury (Article 594 of the penal code) referred to the act of offending someone's honor in their presence and was punishable with up to six months in prison or a fine of up to €516.  The crime of defamation (Article 595, Penal Code) refers to any other situation involving offending one's reputation before many persons, and is punishable with a penalty of up to a year in prison or up to €1,032 in fine, doubled to up to two years in prison or a fine of €2,065 if the offence consists in the attribution of a determined fact. When the offence happens by the means of the press or by any other means of publicity, or in a public demonstration, the penalty is of imprisonment from six months to three years, or a fine of at least €516. Both of them were "" crimes, that is, the victim had the right of choosing, in any moment, to stop the criminal prosecution by withdrawing the "" (a formal complaint), or even prosecute the fact only with a civil action with no "" and therefore no criminal prosecution at all. However, beginning from 15 January 2016, injury is no longer a crime, but a tort, while defamation is still considered a crime like before.

Finally, Article 31 of the Penal Code establishes that crimes committed with abuse of power or with abuse of a profession or art, or with the violation of a duty inherent to that profession or art, lead to the additional penalty of a temporary ban in the
exercise of that profession or art.

Deliberately false accusations of defamation, as with any other crime, lead to the crime of calumny (Article 368, Penal Code), which, under the Italian legal system, is defined as the crime of falsely accusing, before the authorities, a person of a crime they did not commit.

As to the trial, judgment on the legality of the evidence fades into its relevance.

Japan
The Japanese Penal Code (note: translation from government, but still not official text) seems to prescribe these related offences:

 "False Accusations" (false: indictment / criminal charge / criminal accusation / information) (Article 172)
 "Defamation" (slander/libel) (truth being irrelevant, but with: "Special Provision for Matters Concerning Public Interest") (Articles 230, 230-2. See also 232: "prosecuted only upon complaint")
 "Insults" (Article 231. See also 232: "prosecuted only upon complaint")
 "Damage to Credibility; Obstruction of Business" (defamation of businesses) (Article 233)

Additionally, there is an exception stemming from Article XXI of the Constitution concerning freedom of the press, which provides that media outlets can avoid liability for defamation if they reasonably believed the defamatory statements they published to be true.

The Constitution of Japan reads:

Malaysia
In Malaysia, defamation is both a tort and a criminal offence meant to protect the reputation and good name of a person. The principal statutes relied upon are the Defamation Act 1957 (Revised 1983) and the Penal Code. Following the practice of other common law jurisdictions like the United Kingdom, Singapore, and India, Malaysia relies on case law. In fact, the Defamation Act 1957 is similar with the English Defamaiton Act 1952.

Mexico
In Mexico, crimes of calumny, defamation and slanderous allegation have been abolished in the Federal Penal Code as well as in fifteen states. These crimes remain in the penal codes of seventeen states, where penalty is, in average, from 1.1 years (for ones convicted for slanderous allegation) to 3.8 years in jail (for those convicted for calumny).

Netherlands

In the Netherlands, defamation is mostly dealt with by lodging a civil complaint at the District Court. Article 167 of book 6 of the Civil Code holds: "When someone is liable towards another person under this Section because of an incorrect or, by its incompleteness, misleading publication of information of factual nature, the court may, upon a right of action (legal claim) of this other person, order the tortfeasor to publish a correction in a way to be set by court." If the court grants an injunction, the defendant is usually ordered to delete the publication or to publish a rectification statement.

Norway
In Norway, defamation was a crime punished with imprisonment of up to six months or a fine (Penal Code, Chapter 23, § 246). When the offense is likely to harm one's "good name" and reputation, or exposes him to hatred, contempt or loss of confidence, the maximum prison term went up to one year, and if the defamation happens in print, in broadcasting or through an especially aggravating circumstance, imprisonment may have reached two years (§ 247). When the offender acts "against his better judgment", he was liable to a maximum prison term of three years (§ 248). According to § 251, defamation lawsuits must be initiated by the offended person, unless the defamatory act was directed to an indefinite group or a large number of persons, when it may also have been prosecuted by public authorities.

Under the new Penal Code, decided upon by the Parliament in 2005, defamation would cease to exist as a crime. Rather, any person who believes he or she has been subject to defamation will have to press civil lawsuits. The Criminal Code took effect on 1 October 2015.

Poland
In Poland, defamation is a crime that consists of accusing someone of a conduct that may degrade him in public opinion or expose him "to the loss of confidence necessary for a given position, occupation or type of activity". Penalties include fine, limitation of liberty and imprisonment for up to a year (Article 212.1 of the Criminal Code). The penalty is more severe when the offence happens through the media (Article 212.2). When the insult is public and aims at offending a group of people or an individual because of his or their nationality, ethnicity, race, religion or lack of religion, the maximum prison term is three years.

Portugal
In Portugal, defamation crimes are: "defamation" (article 180 of the Penal Code; up to six months in prison, or a fine of up to 240 days), "injuries" (art. 181; up to three months in prison, or a fine up to 120 days), and "offence to the memory of a deceased person" (art. 185; up to 6 months in prison or a fine of up 240 days). Penalties are aggravated in cases with publicity (art. 183; up to two years in prison or at least 120 days of fine) and when the victim is an authority (art.184; all other penalties aggravated by an extra half). There is yet the extra penalty of "public knowledge of the court decision" (costs paid by the defamer) (art. 189 of Penal Code) and also the crime of "incitement of a crime" (article 297; up to three years in prison, or fine).

Romania
As of 2022, there is no such crime as libel, insult or defamation.

Philippines
Title thirteen of the Revised Penal Code of the Philippines addresses Crimes Against Honor. Chapter one of that title addresses libel and slander. Libel is defined as "public and malicious imputation of a crime, or of a vice or defect, real or imaginary, or any act, omission, condition, status, or circumstance tending to cause the dishonor, discredit, or contempt of a natural or juridical person, or to blacken the memory of one who is dead". Slander is defined as oral defamation. Slander by deed is defined as "any act not included and punished in this title, which shall cast dishonor, discredit or contempt upon another person". Penalties of fine or imprisonment are specified for these crimes and for the threat of libel. A notable characteristic of these crimes under Philippine law is the specification that they apply to imputations both real and imaginary. The United Nations Human Rights Committee ruled in 2012 that the libel law of the Philippines was inconsistent with Article 19 of the International Covenant on Civil and Political Rights as well as urging that "State parties [to the Covenant] should consider the decriminalisation of libel".

Saudi Arabia
In Saudi Arabia, defamation of the state, or a past or present ruler, is punishable under terrorism legislation. In a 2015 case, a Saudi writer was arrested for defaming a former ruler of the country. Reportedly, under a [2014] counterterrorism law, "actions that 'threaten Saudi Arabia's unity, disturb public order, or defame the reputation of the state or the king' are considered acts of terrorism. The law decrees that a suspect can be held incommunicado for 90 days without the presence of their lawyer during the initial questioning."

South Korea

In South Korea, both true and false statements can be considered defamation. The penalties increase for false statements. It is also possible for a person to be criminally defamed when they are no longer alive.

Criminal defamation occurs when a public statement damages the subject's reputation, unless the statement was true and presented solely for the public interest. In addition to criminal law, which allows for imprisonment (up to seven years in case the allegations are false) and monetary fines, in South Korea one can also sue for damages with civil actions. Generally, criminal actions proceed civil ones with South Korean police as judicial investigators.

Former Soviet Union
In the former Soviet Union, defamatory insults can "only constitute a criminal offence, not a civil wrong".

Spain
In Spain, the crime of calumny (Article 205 of the Penal Code) consists of accusing someone of a crime knowing the falsity of the accusation, or with a reckless contempt for truth. Penalties for cases with publicity are imprisonment from six months to two years or a fine of 12 to 24 months-fine, and for other cases only a fine of six to twelve months-fine (Article 206). Additionally, the crime of injury (Article 208 of the Penal Code) consists of hurting someone's dignity, depreciating his reputation or injuring his self-esteem, and is only applicable if the offence, by its nature, effects and circumstances, is considered by the general public as strong. Injury has a penalty of fine from three to seven months-fine, or from six to fourteen months-fine when it is strong and with publicity. According to Article 216, an additional penalty to calumny or injury may be imposed by the judge, determining the publication of the judicial decision (in a newspaper) at the expenses of the defamer.

Sweden
In Sweden, denigration is criminalised by Chapter 5 of the Criminal Code. Article 1 regulates defamation and consists of pointing out someone as a criminal or as "having a reprehensible way of living", or of providing information about them "intended to cause exposure to the disrespect of others". The penalty is a fine. It is generally not a requirement that the statements are untrue; it is enough if they statements are meant to be vilifying.

Article 2 regulates gross defamation and has a penalty of up to two years in prison or a fine. In judging if the crime is gross, the court should consider whether the information, because of its content or the scope of its dissemination, is calculated to produce "serious damage". For example, if it can be established that the defendant knowingly conveyed untruths. Article 4 makes it a crime to defame a deceased person according to Article 1 or 2. Most obviously, the paragraph is meant to make it illegal to defame someone's parents as a way to bypass the law.

Article 3 regulates other insulting behaviour, not characterised under Article 1 or 2, and is punishable with a fine or, if it is gross, with up to six months of prison or a fine. While an act of defamation involves a third person, it is not a requirement for insulting behaviour.

Under exemptions in the Freedom of the Press Act, Chapter 7, both criminal and civil lawsuits may be brought to court under the laws on denigration.

Switzerland
In Switzerland, the crime of wilful defamation is punished with a maximum term of three years in prison, or with a fine of at least thirty days' fine, according to Article 174-2 of the Swiss Criminal Code. There is wilful defamation when the offender knows the falsity of his/her allegations and intentionally looks to ruin the reputation of one's victim (see Articles 174-1 and 174–2).

On the other hand, defamation is punished only with a maximum monetary penalty of 180 daily penalty units (Article 173–1). When it comes to a deceased or absent person, there is a limitation to enforce the law up to 30 years (after the death).

With the rise of the internet, and also intranets (closed computer networks), defamatory statements may be communicated on webpages or internal memos, without reaching the attention of the courts. Such "closet defamation" may be used to conceal other criminal or negligent acts.

Thailand
The Thai Criminal Code provides that:

Criminal defamation charges in Thailand under Section 326 of the Criminal Code are frequently used to censor journalists and activists critical of human rights circumstances for workers in the country.

United Kingdom
The United Kingdom abolished criminal libel on 12 January 2010 by section 73 of the Coroners and Justice Act 2009. There were only a few instances of the criminal libel law being applied. Notably, the Italian anarchist Errico Malatesta was convicted of criminal libel for denouncing the Italian state agent Ennio Belelli in 1912.

Under English common law, proving the truth of the allegation was originally a valid defence only in civil libel cases. Criminal libel was construed as an offence against the public at large based on the tendency of the libel to provoke breach of peace, rather than being a crime based upon the actual defamation per se; its veracity was therefore considered irrelevant. Section 6 of the Libel Act 1843 allowed the proven truth of the allegation to be used as a valid defence in criminal libel cases, but only if the defendant also demonstrated that publication was for the "public benefit".

United States

Less than half of American states have criminal defamation laws, but the applicability of those laws is limited by the First Amendment to the U.S. Constitution, and the laws are rarely enforced. There are no criminal defamation or insult laws at the federal level. However, on the state level, 23 states and two territories have criminal defamation laws on the books: Alabama, Florida, Idaho, Illinois, Kansas, Kentucky, Louisiana, Massachusetts, Michigan, Minnesota, Mississippi, Montana, Nevada, New Hampshire, New Mexico, North Carolina, North Dakota, Oklahoma, South Carolina, Texas, Utah, Virginia, Wisconsin, Puerto Rico and Virgin Islands. In addition, Iowa criminalizes defamation through case law without statutorily defining it as a crime.

Noonan v. Staples is sometimes cited as precedent that truth is not always a defence to libel in the U.S., but the case is actually not valid precedent on that issue because Staples did not argue First Amendment protection, which is one theory for truth as complete defence, for its statements. The court assumed in this case that the Massachusetts law was constitutional under the First Amendment without it being argued by the parties.

Venezuela
In March 2016, a civil action for defamation led to imposition of a four-year prison sentence on a newspaper publisher.

Online defamation

The rise of the internet as a medium for publication and the expression of ideas, including the emergence of social media platforms transcending national boundaries, has proven challenging to reconcile with traditional notions of defamation law. Questions of jurisdiction and conflicting limitation periods in trans-border online defamation cases, liability for hyperlinks to defamatory content, filing lawsuits against anonymous parties, and the liability of internet service providers and intermediaries make online defamation a uniquely complicated area of law. As a result, courts and legislatures in different jurisdictions have approached online defamation in a variety of different and conflicting ways.

In South Korea, the rise of the internet has led to the emergence of cyber defamation law as a distinct and polarising field of law. Some Korean celebrities who suffered from severe depression linked malicious online comments later committed suicide, which served in part to stimulate moves to strengthen cyber defamation law. The vast majority of cyber defamation police reports in South Korea arise from online games, and, in 2015 alone, South Korean law enforcement received and investigated over 8,000 reports of cyber defamation; over half of these cases involve League of Legends, where players head to police stations as a retaliation after being verbally abused by teammates or opponents. There are even 'settlement fee hunters', where players enter games and grief with intention of being insulted by other players. In some cases, such settlement fee hunters file police reports against over 50 other individuals at once. Most of the victims of settlement fee hunters are teenagers, since many parents are willing to pay settlement fees ranging from 300,000 to 2,000,000 KRW (US$300–2000) to avoid their children having to go to trial and risk gaining criminal records.

In 2012, the Philippines enacted Republic Act 10175, titled Cybercrime Prevention Act of 2012. Essentially, this Act provides that libel is criminally punishable and describes it as: "Libel – the unlawful or prohibited act as defined in Article 355 of the Revised Penal Code, as amended, committed through a computer system or any other similar means which may be devised in the future." Professor Harry Roque of the University of the Philippines has written that under this law, electronic libel is punished with imprisonment from six years and one day to up to twelve years. , five petitions claiming the law to be unconstitutional had been filed with the Philippine Supreme Court, one by Senator Teofisto Guingona III. The petitions all claim that the law infringes on freedom of expression, due process, equal protection and privacy of communication.

Australia's first Twitter defamation case to go to trial is believed to be Mickle v Farley. The defendant, former Orange High School student Andrew Farley was ordered to pay $105,000 to a teacher for writing defamatory remarks about her on the social media platform. A more recent case in defamation law was Hockey v Fairfax Media Publications Pty Limited [2015], heard in the Federal Court of Australia. This judgment was significant as it demonstrated that tweets, consisting of even as little as three words, can be defamatory, as was held in this case.

Regarding defamation on the internet, in 2011 the Supreme Court of Canada held that a person who posts hyperlinks on a website which lead to another site with defamatory content is not publishing that defamatory material for the purposes of libel and defamation law.

In Singapore, Division 2 of Part 3 of the Protection from Harassment Act 2014 provides for individuals who have been affected by false statements online to seek a variety of court orders under the tort of harassment that are not available under the pre-internet tort of defamation:
 Stop Publication Order (an order requiring the tortfeasor to stop making the defamatory statement)
 Correction Order (an order for the tortfeasor to publish a correction of the statement)
 Disabling Order (an order requiring an internet-based intermediaries to disable access to the defamatory statement).

This is distinct from and does not affect plaintiffs right of action under the common law torts of libel and slander as modified by the Defamation Act 1957. The Protection of Harassment Act 2014, which provides for criminal penalties in addition to civil remedies, is specifically designed to address a narrower scope of conduct in order to avoid outlawing an overly broad range of speech, and is confined to addressing speech that causes "harassment, alarm, or distress".

Beyond simply addressing novel instances of defamation enabled by the rise of the internet, courts around the world have also had to deal with complex jurisdictional issues regarding trans-border online defamation. On 10 December 2002, the High Court of Australia responded to this emerging phenomenon by vastly expanding the international jurisdiction of Australian courts in its judgment in Dow Jones v Gutnick. The judgment established that internet-published foreign publications that defamed an Australian in their Australian reputation could be held accountable under Australian defamation law. The case gained worldwide attention and is often said, inaccurately, to be the first of its kind. A similar case that predates Dow Jones v Gutnick is Berezovsky v Forbes in England. This decision was criticised in the United States, though it mirrors similar decisions in many other jurisdictions such as England, Scotland, France, Canada and Italy.

In response to the expansion of other jurisdictions' attempts to enforce judgements in cases of trans-border defamation and to a rise in domestic strategic lawsuits against public participation (SLAPPs) following the rise of the internet, the Federal and many state governments in America have adopted statutes limiting the enforceability of offshore defamation judgments and expediting the dismissal of defamation claims. American writers and publishers are shielded from the enforcement of offshore libel judgments not compliant under the SPEECH Act, which was passed by the 111th United States Congress and signed into law by President Barack Obama in 2010. It is based on the New York State 2008 Libel Terrorism Protection Act (also known as "Rachel's Law", after Rachel Ehrenfeld who initiated the state and federal laws). Both the New York state law and the federal law were passed unanimously.

Religious views

Catholic

The Catholic Encyclopedia defines slander as "the attributing to another of a fault of which one knows him to be innocent".

The effects of it are "a twofold malice, that which grows out of damage unjustly done to our neighbor's good name and that of lying as well. Theologians say that this latter guilt considered in itself, in so far as it is an offence against veracity, may not be grievous, but that nevertheless it will frequently be advisable to mention it in confession, in order that the extent and method of reparation may be settled."

Defamation in said to be a violation of the eighth commandment: "Thou shalt not bear false witness against thy neighbor." Joseph Deharbe lists two possible reasons when one is "allowed, and even bound, to reveal them, 1. When it is for the good of the guilty person; or 2. When it is necessary for preventing a greater evil."

In the Epistle of James there are two references to defamation: "If any man offend not in word, the same is a perfect man"; and again, "The tongue is indeed a little member, and boasts great things. Behold how small a fire what a great wood it kindles." (James 3:2,5)

Based on these verse, the Roman Catechism makes the following statement: "from these words of St. James we learn two salutary truths: the one, that the vice of the tongue is of great extent, a truth which derives additional confirmation from these words of the prophet, 'Every man is a liar' (Ps. 115:11); whence this moral disease would seem to be almost the only one which extends to all mankind: the other, that the tongue is the source of innumerable evils."

Jean-Baptiste Massillon gives a lengthy sermon on defamation in which he states, "the tongue of the slanderer is a devouring fire, which tarnishes whatever it touches; which exercises its fury on the good grain, equally as on the chaff; on the profane, as on the sacred; which wherever it passes, leaves only desolation and ruin; digs even into the bowels of the earth, and fixes itself on things the most hidden; turns into vile ashes, what, only a moment before, had appeared to us so precious and brilliant."

See also

 Absence of Malice
 
 Anti-Defamation League
 Blind item
 Blood libel
 Character assassination
 Chilling effect (law)
 Crimen injuria
 Criminal libel
 Cyber Bullying
 Cyber defamation law
 Defamation Act
 Defamation of religion and the United Nations
 Depp v. Heard
 Dignitary tort
 False accusation
 Hate speech
 Insult (legal)
 Intentional tort
 LGBT grooming conspiracy theory
 Libel Act
 Libel tourism
 Libs of TikTok
 Malicious prosecution
 Martin v. Hearst Corporation
 Political libel
 Rector v. Major League Baseball Advanced Media
 Rumor
 Small penis rule
 Smear campaign
 Strategic lawsuit against public participation
 United States free speech exceptions

References
Informational notes

Citations

Bibliography

External links

External links

 

 
Bullying
Communication of falsehoods
Honor crimes
Journalism ethics
Tort law
Censorship
Lying